|}

The Sidney Banks Memorial Novices' Hurdle is a National Hunt Listed novice hurdle race in England which is open to horses aged four years or older. 
It is run at Huntingdon over a distance of about 2 miles and 3½ furlongs (2 miles 3 furlongs and 137 yards or 3,947 metres), and it is scheduled to take place each year in February.

The race was first run in 1976 and named after local racehorse trainer Sidney Banks, who died in 1973. His son, Michael Banks, was a chairman of Huntingdon Racecourse.

Winners

See also
Horse racing in Great Britain
List of British National Hunt races

References

Racing Post:
 

National Hunt hurdle races
National Hunt races in Great Britain
Huntingdon Racecourse
Recurring sporting events established in 1976
1976 establishments in England